Nicholas Julian Bell (born 5 September 1950) is a British fencer. He competed at the 1976 and 1984 Summer Olympics. In 1977, he won the foil title at the British Fencing Championships.

He later went to the 1999 World Championships at the age of 49, after two years earlier taking up epee. A return to foil in 2004 lead to him winning that year's Welsh open.

References

1950 births
Living people
British male fencers
Olympic fencers of Great Britain
Fencers at the 1976 Summer Olympics
Fencers at the 1984 Summer Olympics
Sportspeople from Guildford